Eemnes is a municipality and a village in the Netherlands, in the province of Utrecht.

The town of Eemnes 

Eemnes formerly consisted of two villages, Eemnes-Binnen ("Inner Eemnes") and Eemnes-Buiten ("Outer Eemnes"). These names referred to the location of the villages with respect to the dyke of the river Eem.

Eemnes-Buiten received city rights in 1345; Eemnes-Binnen was granted city rights in 1439.

Dutch topographic map of the municipality of Eemnes, June 2015

Pools 
Until 1932, when the Afsluitdijk sealed off the Zuiderzee from the North Sea, the weak dykes in this part of the country would occasionally break during storms. This resulted in the formation of pools, which in Dutch are called "waaien" or "wielen". Because they could be tens of meters in diameter and several metres deep, landowners often did not make the effort of filling them up. Because they symbolize man's battle against the sea and are relatively rare, provincial authorities designated them "geological monuments" in June 2005.

Notable people 
 Johannes Gijsbertus de Casparis (1916 in Eemnes – 2002) was a Dutch orientalist and Indologist 
 Roland van Benthem (born 1968 in Emmeloord) a Dutch politician and former mayor of Eemnes (2005-2022).

Gallery

References

External links 

Official website

 
Municipalities of Utrecht (province)
Populated places in Utrecht (province)